Karanampettai is a town located in the Tiruppur district of Tamil Nadu, India. It is a suburb of Coimbatore.It lies on the National Highway 81. It is a part of Palladam taluk and Palladam (state assembly constituency) which comes under the Coimbatore Parliament Constituency.

Geography
It has an average elevation of 305 meters. It is located at about 30 km from Coimbatore and 29 km from Tiruppur.It lies on the National Highway 81 (India) Trichy Road connecting the city of Coimbatore with central and eastern parts of Tamilnadu.

Demographics
As per 2011 census,the population of the town is 6987.
 India census,

Transport
Karanampettai is well connected by Road and Rail. The nearest railway stations are at Sulur Road railway station which is 7 km away and Somanur which is 8 km away from the town.The nearest airport is Coimbatore International Airport.The town is connected well with Coimbatore, Tiruppur, Madurai and Tiruchirappalli. The town has frequent town buses to Gandhipuram Central Bus Terminus and Ukkadam Bus Terminus in Coimbatore.

The Eastern bypass for Coimbatore city is planned between Karanampettai and Narasimhanaickenpalayam to avoid traffic congestion in the city.

Coimbatore metro
The Corridor-III is planned to connect Karanampettai in Trichy Road to Thaneerpandal in Thadagam Road covering a distance of 42 km,being the second longest corridor in Coimbatore metro.

Air Force Station Sulur
Sulur Air Force Base operated by the Indian Air Force is located at Kangayampalayam village near Sulur. It is located at a distance of 5 km.

A defence corridor project has been  proposed near to Karanampettai.

Education
The Educational Institutions in Karanampettai are:
 Karanampettai High School
Adharsh Vidhyalaya Matric Hr. Sec. School

References

Suburbs of Coimbatore
Cities and towns in Tiruppur district